A Carol Christmas is a TV movie starring Tori Spelling, Dinah Manoff, William Shatner, Jason Brooks and Gary Coleman. It premiered on the Hallmark Channel in 2003. The film is an adaptation of Charles Dickens' 1843 novella A Christmas Carol.

Plot
Carol Cartman (Tori Spelling) is a conceited sensationalist talk show host. She is cynical, selfish, and generally treats her employees with cold contempt. She has been coached by her late Aunt Marla (Dinah Manoff) to behave this way.

On Christmas Eve, hours before her talk show is set to go on the air for a holiday special, she is haunted by the spirit of Aunt Marla (who is wrapped in golden chains), who warns Carol of the mistakes she made in her life, and the terrible similar fate awaiting her if she does not change, also mentioning that she will be visited by three spirits that will show her her wrongs and attempt to steer her back on the right path.

The Ghost of Christmas Past (Gary Coleman) shows Carol incidents from her childhood to adulthood where Aunt Marla shaped Carol into the person she is in the present: Marla fought for Carol to get the lead role in a Christmas play over another little girl who deserved the part, drove away her love interest, John Joyce, who was going to propose marriage to her, and pushed to advance her niece's career in order to bolster herself financially. Carol and the ghost's last stop is Aunt Marla's sparsely-attended funeral.

The Ghost of Christmas Present (William Shatner) the takes Carol to see how her former love interest John, sister Beth, and assistant Roberta will spend this Christmas. John continues his work helping to feed the homeless, while Beth and her husband read A Christmas Carol to their children. Roberta's festivities with her daughter Lily and Carol's studio manager Jimmy are disrupted by a visit by Roberta's ex-husband and Lily's father Frank. The two addresses each other bitterly, and he reveals that he intends to take her to court for custody of Lily, and presents her with a document stating the same.

The Ghost of Christmas Future (James Cromwell) is a mute limo driver who takes Carol on a tour, showing her what is apparently to happen starting next Christmas. Carol walks off her show after refusing to do a segment that hits too close to home for her, and her studio boss sues her for breach of contract; as a result, her career bottoms out and she is reduced to poverty and making low-level community appearances. Roberta goes to see Lily, now in her father's care. Lily is very upset and lashes out at her mother, who apparently is never able to visit due to being tied up with work. Finally, Carol watches herself die and learns that her funeral will have even fewer attendees than that of her Aunt Marla with only Roberta and Jimmy attending. Roberta reveals that Lily is now married and living in Chicago, and the two are now estranged due to the former's belief that her mother prioritized work over her. From her coffin, Carol pleads for another chance at life. The ghost shakes his head and closes it, but Carol wakes up in her dressing room.

Changed by the encounters with the ghosts, Carol becomes a warm, caring person, and vows to make amends. She goes on to her television show and gives a touching speech to her audience about the importance of Christmas and giving. She also gives Roberta a raise, and time to be with Lily, and offers her her lawyer's assistance against her ex-husband's (future) attempt to get custody of Lily. After the show, she goes to her sister's house to spend the holidays with Beth and her family and reconciles with John, who has retained his feelings for her over the years.

At the very end, the three Christmas Spirits reappear outside Beth's house and comment on their work at transforming Carol Cartman. They watch and listen as Beth's son recites the last line of A Christmas Carol: "God bless us, every one!"

Cast
 Tori Spelling as Carol Cartman who is based on Ebeneezer Scrooge
 Gage Golightly as Young Carol
 Dinah Manoff as Aunt Marla. Based on Jacob Marley
 William Shatner as Dr. Bob/The Ghost of Christmas Present 
 Gary Coleman as The Ghost of Christmas Past
 Michael Landes as Jimmy
 Paula Trickey as Beth, Carol's sister who has two children. Beth is based on Ebenezer Scrooge's nephew Fred.
 Nina Siemaszko as Roberta Timmins. Based on Bob Cratchit.
 Jason Brooks as John Joyce. Based on Belle.
 Holmes Osborne as Hal
 Holliston Coleman as Lily. Based on Tiny Tim.
 James Cromwell as the Ghost of Christmas Future (uncredited)

See also
 List of Christmas films
 List of ghost films
 Adaptations of A Christmas Carol

External links

 
 

2003 television films
2003 films
Films based on A Christmas Carol
American Christmas films
Hallmark Channel original films
Christmas television films
2000s Christmas films